Krisztián Kollega (born October 5, 1985) is a Hungarian footballer plays with Érdi VSE in the Nemzeti Bajnokság III.

Career 
Kollega began his career in 2003 at the youth level with Kaposvári Rákóczi FC, and in 2006 made his first team debut in the Nemzeti Bajnokság I. Throughout his time with Kaposvari he was loaned out to Pécsi MFC, and Kaposvölgye VSC. In 2007, he played in the Nemzeti Bajnokság II with Barcsi SC, and later with Budaörsi SC in 2010. In 2012, he played abroad in the Canadian Soccer League with Mississauga Eagles FC. 

The following season he returned to  Hungary to sign with Szigetszentmiklósi TK, and after played with FC Ajka in 2015. He returned to Kaposvari in 2016 to play in the Nemzeti Bajnokság III. In 2019, he signed with Érdi VSE.

References 
 

1985 births
Living people
Hungarian footballers
Kaposvári Rákóczi FC players
Kaposvölgye VSC footballers
Barcsi SC footballers
Budaörsi SC footballers
Mississauga Eagles FC players
Szigetszentmiklósi TK footballers
FC Ajka players
Nemzeti Bajnokság I players
Canadian Soccer League (1998–present) players
Nemzeti Bajnokság II players
Association football midfielders
Nemzeti Bajnokság III players
Sportspeople from Pécs
21st-century Hungarian people